Ernesto González (born 9 December 1957) is a Nicaraguan boxer. He competed in the men's lightweight event at the 1976 Summer Olympics. At the 1976 Summer Olympics, he lost to Nelson Calzadilla of Venezuela.

References

External links
 

1957 births
Living people
Nicaraguan male boxers
Olympic boxers of Nicaragua
Boxers at the 1976 Summer Olympics
Place of birth missing (living people)
Lightweight boxers